William Wallace McCutcheon (December 20, 1926 – June 17, 2020) was an American politician in the state of Minnesota. He served in the Minnesota Senate from 1971 to 1972 as a Democratic-Farmer-Labor member, representing district 43, and from 1973 to 1980 representing district 80. McCutcheon, a police officer, served as the Chief of the Saint Paul Police Department from 1980 to 1992. McCutcheon died on June 17, 2020, in Frisco, Texas.

References

1926 births
2020 deaths
People from Hayward, Wisconsin
Politicians from Saint Paul, Minnesota
Military personnel from Minnesota
Metropolitan State University alumni
University of Minnesota alumni
American municipal police chiefs
Democratic Party Minnesota state senators
United States Army soldiers